Hurricane Lake is a lake in Cottonwood County, Minnesota in the U.S. state of Minnesota.

Hurricane Lake was named from a tornado which flattened trees on the lakeshore.

References

Lakes of Minnesota
Lakes of Cottonwood County, Minnesota